The Tamworth Cyclones were a Junior ice hockey team based in Tamworth, Ontario, Canada.  They played in the Greater Metro Junior 'A' Hockey League.

History
The Cyclones are one of six expansion teams for the 2007-08 GMHL season.

The Cyclones were a team known for brawls and always drew a crowd at home or on the road. They had some extremely tough players and also some very talented players who went on to have very successful careers. Some games found the teams bus police escorted out of town and it was always likely to see a fight or brawl in the stands or parking lot during or after the game. 

The Tamworth Cyclones played their first ever game on September 7, 2007, against the Deseronto Storm in Deseronto, Ontario.  The Storm defeated the Cyclones 3–2.  On October 13, 2007, the Cyclones celebrated their first victory by defeating the Douro Dukes by a score of 9–2.

Despite a very slow start to their season, the Cyclone finished the season with much intensity.  Finishing tenth overall in the GMJHL with 14 wins in 42 games, the Cyclones were drafted to play the fourth place Deseronto Storm in the first round of the playoffs.  The underdog Cyclones brought the battle to the Storm.  Game one saw them lose to the Storm 4–3.  The next game had the Cyclones lose a 2-1 nailbiter.  When the games could not seem to get any closer, game three went into overtime with the Storm again prevailing 4–3.  With their backs to wall, the Cyclone fought another close battle with the Storm, but lost by two, including an empty-netter, to bow out of their first ever playoff series 4-games-to-none.

In their second season, the Cyclones struggled finding the net as well as wins.  Before what would have been the team's 75th game, the Cyclones called the game due to not having goaltenders to play the game.  With both goaltender injured, it became clear that the Cyclone might struggle to ice a team anytime soon.  This problem was compounded by the fact that they could not find ice time in their hometown and had to resort to buying ice time from surrounding communities and the poor health of the team's owner.  On February 4, 2009, it became apparent that the Cyclones would not finish the 2008–09 season.  It was announced the next day by the GMHL that the Cyclones would be granted a leave of absence.

Season-by-Season Standings

(*) Team folded.

Playoffs
2008 Lost bye round
Deseronto Storm defeated Tamworth Cyclones 4-games-to-none in bye round

External links
Tamworth Cyclones Webpage
GMHL Official Webpage

Ice hockey teams in Ontario
Junior ice hockey teams in Canada
Ice hockey clubs established in 2007
Ice hockey clubs disestablished in 2009
2007 establishments in Ontario
2009 disestablishments in Ontario
Lennox and Addington County